Tislelizumab (BGB-A317) is a humanized monoclonal antibody directed against PD-1. It prevents PD-1 from binding to the ligands PD-L1 and PD-L2 (hence it is a checkpoint inhibitor). It is being investigated as a treatment for advanced solid tumors.

It is designed to bind less to Fc gamma receptors.

It is being developed by BeiGene (after a period with Celgene Corp).

Medical uses

China
Tislelizumab was approved by China's National Medical Products Administration :
 on December 27, 2019 to treat patients with classical Hodgkin’s lymphoma (cHL) who have received at least two prior therapies 
 and on April 10, 2020 to treat patients with locally advanced or metastatic urothelial carcinoma (UC) with PD-L1 high expression whose disease progressed during or following platinum-containing chemotherapy or within 12 months of neoadjuvant or adjuvant treatment with platinum-containing chemotherapy.

Clinical trials
Phase I trials began in the US and Australia in June 2015 and were expected to complete in mid-2017. Some early results were announced in July 2016.

A pivotal phase 2 clinical trial for urothelial cancer started in China in 2017.

It is in a phase 3 trial for NSCLC.

A multicenter phase 3 trial for advanced hepatocellular carcinoma started in Jan 2018.

Pharmacokinetics
Early phase I clinical trial results give an elimination half-life of 11 to 17 days.

References  

Monoclonal antibodies
Experimental drugs
Orphan drugs